Zaleinae, is a subfamily of beach flies in the family of Canacidae. There are 16 species in 2 genera.

Genera
Zalea  McAlpine, 1985
Suffomyia  Freidberg, 1995

References

Canacidae